Stephen Michael Stirling (born September 30, 1953) is a Canadian-American science fiction and fantasy author who was born in France.  Stirling is well known for his Draka series of alternate history novels and his later time travel/alternate history Nantucket series and Emberverse series.

Early life and education
Stirling was born on September 30, 1953, in Metz, France—then the site of a Royal Canadian Air Force base—to an English mother and Canadian father. He has lived in several countries and currently resides in the United States in New Mexico with his wife Jan.

Stirling, along with Eric Flint, was tuckerized as a Secret Service agent in John Birmingham's alternate history WWII novel Weapons of Choice (2004).

Career
Stirling's novels are generally conflict-driven and often describe military situations and militaristic cultures. In addition to his books' military, adventure, and exploration focus, he often describes societies with cultural values significantly different from modern Western views. One of his recurring topics is the influence of the culture on an individual's outlook and values, with an emphasis on the idea that most people and societies consider themselves moral.

Stirling frequently explores technological development within the context of many of his novels. The Draka, for instance, choose and face a different imperative in their conquest of Africa, and turn earlier to breech-loading firearms and steam power than the rest of the Western world. The stranded islanders of the Nantucket series try to rebuild their technological base once the island is thrown back in time to 1250 BC, while the survivors of the "Change" now face a world where electricity, firearms, and internal combustion no longer work.

Stirling also tends to write strong female characters who have prominent roles within the story.

In the past, he has frequently collaborated with other authors, including David Drake, Jerry Pournelle, Anne McCaffrey, and Raymond E. Feist.

Bibliography

References

External links 

 
 
 
 Stirling, S M on The Encyclopedia of Science Fiction
 Interview with Peter Hodges
 Dragon Page Podcasts Interview with Stirling
  - Magazine column discussing various titles by Stirling, including the Draka trilogy, the Nantucket trilogy, The Peshawar Lancers, and The Sky People.

1953 births
Living people
20th-century American novelists
21st-century American novelists
American alternate history writers
American fantasy writers
American male novelists
American science fiction writers
American people of English descent
Canadian fantasy writers
Canadian emigrants to the United States
Canadian science fiction writers
Writers from New Mexico
Steampunk writers
20th-century Canadian novelists
21st-century Canadian novelists
Canadian male novelists
Canadian alternative history writers
20th-century American male writers
21st-century American male writers